Tramaine Winfrey (born March 9, 1986), professionally known as Young Fyre, or Fyre, is a multi-platinum American record producer, composer, lyricist, and creative director. He was previously signed to T-Pain's record label, Nappy Boy Entertainment. He has worked extensively with T-Pain and produced most of his fourth studio album, Revolver. Young Fyre is also known for his work on Jaden Smith's albums Syre, Erys, and CTV3, his collaboration with artist Trinidad James on 2020's Black Filter, as producer and co-writer of Tay Money's "The Assignment", and as the co-founder of AudeoBox, a plugin and sound pack music tech company for professional producers.

Young Fyre has worked with music industry names such as Britney Spears, Tech N9ne, Krizz Kaliko, Lil Wayne, Chris Brown, Busta Rhymes, Big Time Rush, Nicky Jam, Tank, Rico Love, Will Smith, Jaden Smith, A$AP Rocky, Kehlani, Cousin Stizz, Marc Anthony, Young Buck, Bad Bunny, Benny Benassi, Tamar Braxton, The OMG Girlz, Trinidad James, Tay Money, and many others. Among the notable songs credited to him are T-Pain's "Best Love Song" featuring Chris Brown, Britney Spears'  "Private Show" and "What You Need", "Rap Song" featuring Rick Ross, "Booty Wurk (One Cheek at a Time)" featuring Joey Galaxy, Ace Hood's "King of the Streets" featuring T-Pain, and Lil' Wayne's "How to Hate" featuring T-Pain.

He lives in Los Angeles, California and travels frequently between Atlanta, Miami, and New York City to record. Young Fyre's publishing catalog from 2008 through 2020 consists of upwards of 135 songs across the hip-hop, Latin and pop genres.

Early life
Young Fyre was born and raised in Des Moines, Iowa. Although most of the music popular in Iowa was pop, rock, and country, Winfrey's parents listened to R&B at home, and he began to experiment with the keyboard when his grandmother purchased one when he was 10. From there, he pursued his passion for music. He attributes his unique sound to these varying influences, explaining "the diversity came from listening to everything". He credits his early musical influences as Timbaland, Missy Elliott, and Busta Rhymes.

Music career

Early career
After years of honing his production skills, Young Fyre first gained recognition on RocBattle.com. After seeing an advertisement for the competition in a copy of XXL, he created a profile and devised a methodical plan to win his battles. Young Fyre posted a beat battle record of 233–9, becoming Grand Champ and defeated established champion Rockwilder. His success on RocBattle gained him recognition in the hip hop community and eventually led to collaborations with numerous rappers in the Midwestern United States.

First Placements
From 2008 to 2009, Young Fyre produced 17 tracks across Tech N9ne's Killer, Sickology 101 and K.O.D. albums, including the single "Like Yeah".  He also produced 6 tracks on Kutt Calhoun’s Feature Presentation and 3 tracks on Big Scoob’s Monsterifik, as well as 1 track each for Young Buck and Yung Berg.

Nappy Boy Entertainment
In 2010, Nappy Boy Entertainment rapper Young Cash (Joey Galaxy) heard Young Fyre's music and joined him on a Skype call along with label founder/owner T-Pain, who called the producer and offered to fly him to Miami for a meeting, where Young Fyre was introduced to industry names like Timbaland at The Hit Factory Criteria Miami.

After signing with Nappy Boy Entertainment, Young Fyre began working with T-Pain and the rest of the Nappy Boy Entertainment roster. He produced the official remix of Travie McCoy's hit song "Billionaire" featuring Bruno Mars. The remix features T-Pain, One Chance & Gucci Mane. He also produced One Chance's "Sexin' On You", Brandon T. Jackson's "Imma Do It Big" featuring T-Pain & One Chance, and Italian electro house DJ/producer Benny Benassi's "Electroman" featuring T-Pain.

In 2011, Young Fyre produced the majority of T-Pain's album Revolver, including "Best Love Song" featuring Chris Brown, "Rap Song" featuring Rick Ross, and "Booty Wurk (One Cheek At a Time)" featuring Joey Galaxy, which were released as singles. Of his work with T-Pain on Revolver, Young Fyre explained, "Our chemistry is unbelievable. It's a joint effort on every song and it's a beautiful thing".

In 2017, Nappy Boy Entertainment filed a lawsuit against Cash Money Records for unpaid royalties for T-Pain and Young Fyre's work on Lil Wayne's Tha Carter III (2008) and Tha Carter IV (2011).

2011 to 2019 
After his work on Revolver, Young Fyre continued to produce, write, and occasionally provide vocals for a variety of artists. In 2015, he was temporarily sidelined by a hip injury, but he continued to create throughout his recovery. In 2016, he produced "Private Show", a track on Britney Spears' ninth studio album Glory, released in August that year, on which he is credited as a producer and composer. It was around this time when Young Fyre was introduced to Jaden Smith, through Fyre's mentor Omarr Rambert. Young Fyre went on to produce Jaden's 2017 album Syre in addition to working with Will Smith on several projects.

AudeoBox 
After his injury in 2015, Young Fyre experimented with sound manipulation during his recovery, combining effects he was using in his own work and enlisting the help of a graphic designer and coder to launch music technology company AudeoBox, with the goal of developing streamlined, simple, and professional plugins and sample packs for artists and creatives involved in music production. In July 2021, in partnership with Splice, AudeoBox launched the comedic web series In The Box, created and directed by Young Fyre, which highlights influential producers and artists in the industry.

Trinidad James 
Young Fyre began collaborating with Trinidadian-American rapper Trinidad James in 2015, and the two worked together on James' Father Figga and Daddy Issues mixtapes. Young Fyre (with Splice's In The Box and Fyre's agency Damn Good Bros) also worked as creative director for ad campaigns for James' brand DADSocks. In August 2021, Fyre and Trinidad James released the album Black Filter to industry acclaim.

Production Credits

References

1986 births
Living people
Midwest hip hop musicians
Musicians from Des Moines, Iowa
Record producers from Iowa